Savignia naniplopi is a species of spiders belonging to the family Linyphiidae. It is only known from two adjacent caves, Arkalospiliara and Doxa, in Heraklion regional unit on the island of Crete, Greece.

All parts are a plain orange colour. The sexes are rather similar apart from the male having a distinctively shaped "snout" which carries two of the eight eyes.

The specific name is a Latin rendering of "Plop the gnome", a reference to the Belgian children's TV character Kabouter Plop. This refers to the subterranean habits of this species and also to the resemblance in shape of the "snout" of the male to Kabouter Plop's hat. The species was described by two Belgians.

References

Linyphiidae
Spiders described in 2002
Spiders of Europe
Endemic fauna of Crete